Charles Christopher Halton  (4 March 193216 October 2013) was a senior Australian public servant.

Life and career
Charles Halton was born on 4 March 1932 in Yorkshire, Northern England.

As an engineer in England in the 1950s and 60s, Halton was associated with the development of the Concorde and the guidance system of the Bristol Bloodhound.

Gough Whitlam appointed Halton Secretary of the Department of Transport in 1973, and Halton and his family moved to Canberra from Canada where they had lived since 1969. The Halton family stayed in Canberra, with Charles Halton appointed to further senior positions in the Australian Public Service, as Secretary of the Department of Defence Support (1982-84), as Chairman leading a taskforce on Youth Allowance Administration (1984–85) and as Secretary of the Department of Communications (1986–87).

Awards
Charles Halton was honoured as a Commander of the Order of the British Empire in 1983.

References

References and further reading

1932 births
Australian public servants
2013 deaths
English emigrants to Australia
Australian Commanders of the Order of the British Empire